Ronald Moody (12 August 1900 – 6 February 1984) was a Jamaican-born sculptor, specialising in wood carvings. His work features in collections including the National Portrait Gallery and Tate Britain in London, as well as the National Gallery of Jamaica. He was the brother of anti-racist campaigner Harold Moody and award-winning physiologist Ludlow Moody.

Biography
Moody was born Ronald Clive Moody in 1900 in Kingston, Jamaica, into a well-off professional family. He attended Calabar College, Jamaica, moving to England in 1923 to study dentistry at King's College London, obtaining his degree in 1930. In London, he was inspired by the British Museum's collection of non-Western art and decided to become a sculptor. Early experiments with clay led him to teach himself how to carve. He produced his first carved figure in oak wood. Entitled Wohin (meaning in German "where to?”, the name of a song by Schubert), that sculpture was bought by Marie Seton in 1935.

Among Moody's most famous works from this period was his great female head, Midonz (1937), which he described as "the goddess of transmutation". By the late 1930s, he had accumulated an impressive collection of work and had a solo show in Paris, France. The success of the show encouraged him to move to Paris in 1938. That year, 12 major sculptures were sent to the Harmon Foundation in the United States to be included in exhibitions at the Baltimore Museum of Art and the Dallas Museum of Art. Moody's success in France was cut short by the onset of the Second World War. In 1940, two days before Paris fell to the Germans, he was forced to flee the city, abandoning his sculptures. (They were retrieved after the war, along with the works that had been sent to the US for exhibition.)
 
After having escaped from Paris, Moody travelled through occupied France, across the Pyrenees into Spain, and eventually arrived back in England in October 1941. His Paris success followed him to London, where he resumed his work after the war and had a one-man show in May 1946 at the Arcade Gallery, off Bond Street. In 1946 he cast a bronze head of his eldest brother Harold Moody (1882–1947, founder of the League of Coloured Peoples).

From 1950 until the early 1960s regular London exhibitions brought Ronald Moody a growing presence on the British art scene. In 1964 he created a sculpture called Savacou for the University of the West Indies (UWI), a stylised depiction of a bird, which is sited on the UWI campus at Mona, Jamaica. He is among those artists associated with the Caribbean Artists Movement (CAM) that was founded in London (1966–72).

Moody died in London in 1984, aged 83. His niece Cynthia Moody, who inherited his estate, thereafter devoted herself to documenting and promoting her uncle's work.

Honours and legacy
In 1977 Moody was given the Jamaican Musgrave Gold Medal, and in 1980 the Centenary Medal by the Institute of Jamaica, although no major exhibitions of his work took place on his native island during his lifetime.

In 2000 the first substantial exhibition of his work took place at the National Gallery of Jamaica. His work featured in the exhibition No Colour Bar: Black British Art in Action 1960–1990 held at the Guildhall Art Gallery, London, from 10 July 2015 to 24 January 2016.

Moody crater on Mercury was named after him in November 2008.

Selected works
 Wohin, 1934
 Johanaan (Peace), 1936
 Midonz (Goddess of Transmutation), 1937
 Tacet, 1938
 Sleeper Mask, 1943
 Dr Harold Moody, 1946
 Savacou, 1964
 Time Hiroshima, 1967
 Paul Robeson, 1968

References

External links

 
 "Papers of Ronald Moody 1900–94", Tate.
 Guy Brett, "A reputation restored: The rediscovery of sculptor Ronald Moody", Tate blog, 1 April 2003 (a revised version of article that appeared in TATE magazine, March/April 2003, Issue 4). Includes Val Wilmer photograph "Moody with Johanaan, 1936, in Fleming Close Studio, Fulham, 1963".

 National Portrait Gallery. NPG 6380
 Manheim, James, "Moody, Ronald 1900–1984", Contemporary Black Biography, 2002. Encyclopedia.com.
 Gemma Romain, "Ronald Moody: Archival explorations of a Black Jamaican artist in interwar London", Media Diversified, 5 April 1015.

1900 births
1984 deaths
Alumni of King's College London
Jamaican artists
Recipients of the Musgrave Medal
20th-century British sculptors
19th-century British sculptors
British male sculptors
Black British artists
Migrants from British Jamaica to the United Kingdom
20th-century Jamaican sculptors
20th-century British male artists
People from Kingston, Jamaica
Caribbean Artists Movement people
19th-century British male artists